Leah McCourt (born 21 June 1992) is a Northern Irish professional mixed martial artist who competes in the Featherweight division of Bellator MMA. She is a former IMMAF World and European Amateur champion and International Brazilian Jiu-Jitsu Federation gold medalist. She is also a black belt in Judo.

As of December 13, 2022, she is #8 in the Bellator Women's pound-for-pound Rankings and #4 in the Bellator Women's Featherweight Rankings.

Background 
McCourt, who grew up on a council estate in Belfast, was put into Judo as a child by her father. From the age of 11, she quit judo and all her spare time was spent riding ponies and horses, competing around Northern Ireland and at places like Balmoral and the Dublin Horseshow. Due to her families financial troubles, she had to ride troubled horses who others were unwilling to own. When she was a teenager, McCourt developed an allergy towards horses, leading her to giving up on her horse riding hobby.

She first started training at a mixed martial arts (MMA) gym at the aged of 18, after giving birth to her daughter, Isabella, and becoming a single mother.

McCourt signed an exclusive multi-year fight sports equipment and sports apparel agreement with Everlast is the first female athlete to be placed on an apparel deal from the UK.

Amateur mixed martial arts career
McCourt started her MMA career in Clan Wars MMA, debuting on 7 June 2014 at Clan Wars 19, winning the fight versus Sarah Louise Scott by armbar submission.

On 1 November 2014 McCourt lost from Aoife Murphy at Clan Wars 20 by TKO (punches).

In November 2015, she won the IMMAF - European Open Championships versus Sini Koivunen (by armbar submission) and Mia Isola (by unanimous decision).

In November 2016, McCourt won the IMMAF - 2016 IMMAF World Championships versus Yvonne Chow (by Kimura submission), Taryn Conklin (by Kimura submission), and Julia Dorny (by TKO).

Professional mixed martial arts career

On 16 June 2018, McCourt took part at CW 94 - Cage Warriors 94 and won the fight versus Manon Fiorot by split decision.

After this win, McCourt signed a six-fight deal with Bellator MMA.

McCourt made her Bellator debut against Hatice Özyurt at Bellator 217 on 23 February 2019. At weigh-ins, Ozyurt came in at 148lbs and was fined 20 per cent of her fight purse. She won the bout via doctor stoppage after the doctor stopped the fight at the end of the first round due to a cut under Hatice's eye.

McCourt won her sophomore performance on 27 September 2019 at Bellator 227 versus Kerry Hughes by Submission (Rear-Naked Choke).

McCourt faced Judith Ruis at Bellator 240 on 22 February 2020. However, on February 4, it was announced that James Gallagher pulled out of the event due to a back injury, thus a McCourt's bout was bumped to the main event. In the process, she became the first woman to headline a MMA event in Europe. McCourt won the bout via unanimous decision.

After her win against Ruis, McCourt had surgery in two places on her right shoulder, which prevented her from fighting again in 2020.

McCourt faced Janay Harding on 21 May 2021 at Bellator 259. At the weigh-ins, McCourt weighed in at 149.4 pounds, three and a half pounds over the featherweight non-title fight limit. The bout proceeded at catchweight and McCourt was fined a percentage of her purse, which went to her opponent Harding. After McCourt caught Harding with an upkick, McCourt locked in the triangle choke and won the bout in the second round.

McCourt faced Jessica Borga on 1 October 2021 at Bellator 267. She won the one-sided bout via unanimous decision.

McCourt faced Sinead Kavanagh on 25 February 2022 at Bellator 275. McCourt lost the bout via unanimous decision.

McCourt faced Dayana Silva on 23 September 2022 at Bellator 285. She won the fight by unanimous decision.

McCourt is scheduled to face Cat Zingano on March 31, 2023 at Bellator 293.

Mixed martial arts record

|-
|Win
|align=center|7–2
|Dayana Silva
|Decision (unanimous)
|Bellator 285
|
|align=center|3
|align=center|5:00
|Dublin, Ireland
|
|-
|Loss
|align=center|6–2
|Sinead Kavanagh
|Decision (unanimous)
|Bellator 275 
|
|align=center|3
|align=center|5:00
|Dublin, Ireland
|
|-
|Win
|align=center| 6–1
|Jessica Borga
|Decision (unanimous)
|Bellator 267 
|
|align=center|3
|align=center|5:00
|London, England
|
|-
|Win
|align=center| 5–1
|Janay Harding
|Submission (triangle choke)
|Bellator 259 
|
|align=center|2
|align=center|2:42
|Uncasville, Connecticut, United States
|
|-
| Win
| align=center| 4–1
|Judith Ruis
|Decision (unanimous)
|Bellator 240
|
|align=center|3
|align=center|5:00
|Dublin, Ireland
| 
|-
| Win
| align=center| 3–1
| Kerry Hughes
|Submission (rear-naked choke)
|Bellator 227
|
|align=center|1
|align=center|2:42
|Dublin, Ireland
| 
|-
| Win
| align=center| 2–1
| Hatice Ozyurt
|TKO (doctor stoppage)
|Bellator 217
|
|align=center|1
|align=center|5:00
|Dublin, Ireland
| 
|-
| Win
| align=center| 1–1
| Manon Fiorot
| Decision (split)
| Cage Warriors 94
| 
| align=center| 3
| align=center| 5:00
| Antwerp, Belgium
|
|-
| Loss
| align=center| 0–1
| Rizlen Zouak
| TKO (punches)
| Cage Warriors 85
| 
| align=center| 2
| align=center| 3:46
| Bournemouth, England
|

See also
 List of current Bellator fighters
 List of female mixed martial artists

References

1992 births
Living people
Female mixed martial artists from Northern Ireland
Featherweight mixed martial artists
Mixed martial artists utilizing judo
Mixed martial artists utilizing Muay Thai
Mixed martial artists utilizing Brazilian jiu-jitsu
Muay Thai practitioners from Northern Ireland
Female Muay Thai practitioners
Brazilian jiu-jitsu practitioners from Northern Ireland
Female Brazilian jiu-jitsu practitioners
Female judoka from Northern Ireland
Bellator MMA champions
Bellator female fighters